Star Air Cargo Pty Ltd, usually known simply as Star Air, is a South African airline that leases out passenger and cargo aircraft.

History 
Star Air has been trading since 1996. It originally operated smaller aircraft, flying courier freight and small cargo for DHL Express (hence the Cargo name) and other companies contracted to fly for FedEx.

After starting to operate passenger flights, Star Air decided to move out of the smaller aircraft and to begin operating the Boeing 737, and started with their first 737-200 aircraft in 2007. Star Air has since negotiated leases with aircraft leasing companies for the newer generation 737-300 and 737-400 aircraft, to replace the 737-200s.

In June 2019, Star Air was acquired by Comair, who reportedly paid $5.14 million to acquire the airline and its repair division, Star Air Maintenance, and in December 2019 the acquisition was confirmed by the South African Competition Commission. However due to financial restraints imposed on Comair during CV19 flight groundings for 5 months in South Africa, in Oct 2020 the deal was cancelled.

Corporate affairs

Ownership and structure

Star Air Cargo Pty Ltd is owned by Peter Annear provides Dry and Wet leasing to the Airline Industry. SAC operates B737-300/400 passenger and freight aircraft.
SAC head office is in Rivonia.  SAC Operation is located at the Denel Aviation Campus.

Star Air Maintenance Pty Ltd (SAM) is a subsidiary company of Star Air, and provides all the AOC’s maintenance requirements up to B checks. SAM also offers line maintenance to third parties, and is based and operates from a hangar in the Denel Aviation Campus facility, at O. R. Tambo International Airport in Johannesburg.

Business model
Star Air's main business is the leasing of aircraft on short and medium term wet and dry leases to scheduled airlines in the sub-Saharan African Region. According to their website, at various times they have had as customers Rwandair, Air Botswana, Air Malawi, Air Tanzania, LAM Mozambique Airlines, South African Express, Air Namibia and Mango Airlines (South Africa), amongst others.

Fleet

Current fleet

The Star Air fleet comprises the following aircraft (as of July 2022):

Historical fleet
The airline fleet previously included the following aircraft (as of December 2011):
 4 Boeing 737-200
 1 Boeing 737-400
 1 Boeing 737-500

References

External links 
Official website

Airlines of South Africa
Cargo airlines